Tsvetan Golomeev (21 July 1961 – 16 September 2010) was a Bulgarian swimmer. He competed at the 1980 Summer Olympics and the 1988 Summer Olympics.

References

External links
 

1961 births
2010 deaths
Bulgarian male swimmers
Olympic swimmers of Bulgaria
Swimmers at the 1980 Summer Olympics
Swimmers at the 1988 Summer Olympics
People from Velingrad
Bulgarian expatriates in Greece
20th-century Bulgarian people
21st-century Bulgarian people